The Zenica-Doboj Canton is one of 10 cantons of the Federation of Bosnia and Herzegovina in Bosnia and Herzegovina. The cantonal seat is the City of Zenica.

History
During the protests and riots in Bosnia and Herzegovina in February 2014, the entire government of the Zenica-Doboj Canton resigned.

Geography
This canton is situated in the central part of Bosnia and Herzegovina. The cantonal capital is Zenica and the other town mentioned in the name is Doboj, which is in Republika Srpska, but part of the former Doboj municipality is in the Zenica-Doboj Canton. The canton has an area of 3,904 km2.

Municipalities
The Zenica-Doboj Canton is split into the following municipalities:

Demographics

2013 Census 
As of 2013 census, a total of 364,433 inhabitants lives in Zenica-Doboj Canton.

See also
 Political divisions of Bosnia and Herzegovina
 List of heads of the Zenica-Doboj Canton
 Zenica coal mine one of the largest deposits in Europe
Radio Žepče

References

 
Cantons of the Federation of Bosnia and Herzegovina